Archduchess Maria Johanna of Austria (4 February 1750 23 December 1762) was an Archduchess of Austria as the eleventh child of Empress Maria Theresa and Emperor Francis I. She was originally meant to marry Ferdinand I of the Two Sicilies, however, the marriage plans were never finalised due to Maria Johanna’s death due to smallpox.

Childhood 
Maria Johanna was born on 4 February 1750 at the Hofburg Palace in Vienna, Austria, as the eleventh child and eighth daughter of Emperor Francis Stephen I and Empress Maria Theresa. She was raised in the Kindskammer with her many siblings, though she was particularly close with her sister Maria Josepha, whom was born a year after Maria Johanna in 1751. The two were educated together and had the same tutors. 

Maria Johanna strictly studied Latin, French, Italian, Greek, Spanish, German, English, history, geography, land surveying, mathematics, and theology—from the age of three. She was also taught how to dance and sing, and was known to have excelled at these subjects. She often gave musical performances, as she loved to sing. She also loved to act.

Additionally, Maria Johanna and her sisters were highly educated in dance and singing. While her brothers were taught to play different instruments, Maria Johanna and her sisters were given singing lessons. A special theatre was built at the Schönbrunn Palace, specially for the children; Maria Johanna and her siblings gave frequent musical performances. All in all, Maria Johanna and her sister Maria Josepha "developed satisfactory, worked hard at their lessons and were involved in numerous festivities in which they participated enthusiastically."

Betrothal 

Maria Theresa and King Charles III of Spain both agreed that Maria Johanna’s sister, Maria Amalia, would marry Charles’ son Ferdinand III, King of Sicily and IV of Naples, however, Charles later wanted to break off the engagement due to Maria Amalia being five years older than Ferdinand. Since Maria Johanna was just one year older than Ferdinand, she was betrothed to him instead.

Death 
 In the second half of the eighteenth-century, smallpox was ravaging through the Holy Roman Empire. Leopold Mozart, father of Wolfgang Amadeus Mozart, wrote that "in the whole of Vienna, nothing was spoken of except smallpox. If 10 children were on the death register, 9 of them had died from smallpox." In December 1762, Maria Johanna caught the disease and died on 23 December; her painful death was described by her sister-in-law Isabella. Her mother, Maria Theresa, found comfort in the fact that before her death Maria Johanna made a complete confession of her sins to a Catholic priest. Maria Theresa wrote to Maria Johanna’s sister, Maria Christina: 

Your sister has confessed her sins for three-quarters of an hour, with a preciseness, repentance and devotion which brought her confessor to tears; since then, she is very weak. I cannot thank the loving God enough that he gives me this comfort; I give her completely into his hand and expect that her destiny cannot be anything than happy."

Aftermath 
The loss of Maria Johanna to smallpox, along with that of other members of the family, contributed to Maria Theresa’s decision to have the younger members of her family inoculated, and the subsequent acceptance of smallpox inoculation in Austria.

Ancestry

References

Bibliography 
 
 
 
 

1750 births
1762 deaths
18th-century Austrian people
18th-century Austrian women
House of Habsburg-Lorraine
Deaths from smallpox
Austrian princesses
Burials at the Imperial Crypt
Burials at St. Stephen's Cathedral, Vienna
Infectious disease deaths in Austria
Daughters of emperors
Children of Maria Theresa
Royalty and nobility who died as children
Daughters of kings